Sulzheim is an Ortsgemeinde – a municipality belonging to a Verbandsgemeinde, a kind of collective municipality – in the Alzey-Worms district in Rhineland-Palatinate, Germany.

Geography

Location
As a winegrowing centre, Sulzheim lies in Germany's biggest winegrowing district, in the middle of the wine region of Rhenish Hesse. It belongs to the Verbandsgemeinde of Wörrstadt, whose seat is in the like-named municipality.

The municipality's highest elevation is the Schildberg at 209 m above sea level. The Sulzheimer Bach rises north of the municipality.

Neighbouring municipalities
Sulzheim's neighbours are Armsheim, Ensheim, Gau-Bickelheim, Gau-Weinheim, Spiesheim, Vendersheim, Wallertheim and Wörrstadt.

History
In 766, Sulzheim had its first documentary mention.

Politics

Municipal council
The council is made up of 16 council members, who were elected by majority vote at the municipal election held on 7 June 2009, and the honorary mayor as chairwoman.

Town partnerships

 Sainte-Suzanne, Mayenne, France since 1967

Sainte-Suzanne is the seat of the like-named canton, and it is with this administrative unit that Sulzheim is partnered, thanks to the initiative of Adam Becker from Sulzheim and Victor Julien, conseiller général, maire de Thorigné-en-Charnie, both honorary citizens of Sulzheim. A square in Sulzheim bears Victor Julien's name; a street in Blandouet bears Adam Becker's. Sainte-Suzanne has a square de Sulzheim, and Vaiges a rue de Sulzheim. In Sulzheim is a street named Ste.-Suzanner-Straße.

Coat of arms
The municipality's arms might be described thus: Azure issuant from base a cross pattée Or between four escallops argent.

Culture and sightseeing

Buildings
Worth seeing is the Baroque Catholic Church of Philippus und Jakobus, built in 1715.

Regular events
The yearly kermis (church consecration festival, locally known as the Kerb) is always held on the first weekend in May.

Famous people
On 29 September 2007, 23-year-old Stefanie Ohl was chosen at the Electoral Palace in Mainz as Rhenish-Hessian Wine Queen for the 2007–2008 season.

Further reading
 Karl-Heinz Kayser, Die Geschichte unseres Dorfes, Chronik Sulzheim, Caritas-Druckerei Mainz-Mombach, 2006

References

External links
Municipality’s official webpage 

Alzey-Worms